Joseph Wechsberg (29 August 1907 – 10 April 1983) was a Jewish Moravian writer, journalist, musician, and gourmet. Born in Ostrava, in Moravia, Czechoslovakia, he and his wife requested and received asylum in the United States in 1939 when Germany invaded Czechoslovakia. His mother was among the Czech Jews interned by the Nazis and later was murdered at Auschwitz. 
Over his career he was a prolific writer who wrote over two dozen works of nonfiction, including books on music and musicians, and contributed numerous articles to publications such as The New Yorker.

Bibliography

Books
 
 Looking for a Bluebird, Penguin, 1948
 Blue Trout & Black Truffles (the peregrinations of an Epicure), Alfred A.Knopf, 1954
 Avalanche, Weidenfeld and Nicolson, 1958
 Red Plush and Black Velvet: the Story of Dame Nellie Melba and her Times, Little, Brown and Company, Boston, 1962.
 The Merchant Bankers, Little, Brown and Company, Boston, 1966.
 The Murderers Among Us,  McGraw-Hill, New York, 1967. LCN 67-13204.
 The Voices, 1969
 The First Time Around: Some Irreverent Recollections, Little, Brown and Company, Boston, 1970. LCN 75-108954.
 The Glory of the Violin, Viking Adult, 1973, 
 The Lost World of the Great Spas, New York: Harper & Row, 1979 
 The Vienna I Knew, Doubleday & Company, Inc., Garden City, New York, 1979, ISBN 0-385-12674-3
 Trifles Make Perfection: Selected Essays of Joseph Wechsberg, Boston: David R. Godine, 1999  LCN 98-29258

Short fiction 

Stories

———————
Notes

In popular culture

Wechsberg's book Blue Trout & Black Truffles was gifted by Nick Kokonas to Grant Achatz while Nick was trying to convince Grant to form a restaurant partnership with him. The result was Alinea, the only Chicago restaurant to retain a three-star status, Michelin’s highest accolade.

References

External links 
 

1907 births
1983 deaths
20th-century Czech male musicians
20th-century Czech people
20th-century journalists
20th-century violinists
Czech Jews
Czech food writers
Czech journalists
Czech male writers
Czech violinists
Esquire (magazine) people
Male violinists
Musicians from Ostrava
The New Yorker people
Writers from Ostrava